Youssef Soliman, (born 10 January 1997 in Cairo) is a professional squash player who represented Egypt. He reached a career-high world ranking of World No. 11 in October 2022. He has had three titles back to back after a year of turning pro and some several titles came afterwards through the years. Youssef in one of his interviews a couple of years back when he was breaking into the top 30 etc. mentioned that he is targeting the top spot on tour as he has beaten several top 10 players in previous encounters.

References

External links 

Egyptian male squash players
Living people
1997 births
21st-century Egyptian people